Hartman is an unincorporated community in Stokes County, North Carolina, United States, near Danbury and Hanging Rock State Park.

Unincorporated communities in Stokes County, North Carolina
Unincorporated communities in North Carolina